Pamela Munn  is an academic researcher and former Dean of the University of Edinburgh Moray House School of Education. She was awarded an OBE for services to education in Scotland in 2005. She is a former president of the British Educational Research Association (BERA) and is a member of the Academy of Social Sciences.

Munn was a member of other national committees  and policy reviews including the Reference Group for the Donaldson Review of teacher education in Scotland 2010, the committee on Education for Citizenship in Scotland,  the Curriculum Review Group, which established the principles underpinning Curriculum for Excellence and the Review of Initial Teacher Education. Munn retired from the University of Edinburgh in 2010. She continues to contribute to national debates and policy making about the state of education in Scotland.

References 

Academics of the University of Edinburgh
Education in Scotland
Members of the Order of the British Empire
Women academics
Living people
Year of birth missing (living people)